Psychobabble (a portmanteau of "psychology" or "psychoanalysis" and "babble") is a form of speech or writing that uses psychological jargon, buzzwords, and esoteric language to create an impression of truth or plausibility. The term implies that the speaker or writer lacks the experience and understanding necessary for the proper use of psychological terms. Additionally, it may imply that the content of speech deviates markedly from common sense and good judgement.

Some buzzwords that are commonly heard in psychobabble have come into widespread use in business management, motivational seminars, self-help, folk psychology, and popular psychology.

Frequent use of psychobabble can associate a clinical, psychological word with meaningless, or less meaningful, buzzword definitions. Laypersons often use such words when they describe life problems as clinical maladies even though the clinical terms are not meaningful or appropriate.

Most professions develop a unique vocabulary or jargon which, with frequent use, may become commonplace buzzwords. Professional psychologists may reject the "psychobabble" label when it  is applied to their own special terminology.

The allusions to psychobabble imply that some psychological concepts lack precision and have become meaningless or pseudoscientific.

Origin
Psychobabble was defined by the writer who coined the word, R.D. Rosen, as a set of repetitive verbal formalities that kills off the very spontaneity, candour, and understanding it pretends to promote. It’s an idiom that reduces psychological insight to a collection of standardized observations that provides a frozen lexicon to deal with an infinite variety of problems.  The word itself came into popular use after his 1977 publication of Psychobabble: Fast Talk and Quick Cure in the Era of Feeling.

Rosen coined the word in 1975 in a book review for The Boston Phoenix, then featured it in a cover story for the magazine New Times titled "Psychobabble: The New Language of Candor." His book Psychobabble explores the dramatic expansion of psychological treatments and terminology in both professional and non-professional settings.

Likely contexts
Certain terms considered to be psychological jargon may be dismissed as psychobabble when they are used by laypersons or in discussions of popular psychology themes. New Age philosophies, self-help groups, personal development coaching, and large-group awareness training are often said to employ psychobabble.

The word "psychobabble" may refer contemptuously to pretentious psychological gibberish. Automated talk-therapy offered by various ELIZA computer programs produce notable examples of conversational patterns that are psychobabble, even though they may not be loaded with jargon. ELIZA programs parody clinical conversations in which a therapist replies to a statement with a question that requires little or no specific knowledge.

"Neurobabble" is a related term. Beyerstein (1990) wrote that neurobabble can appear in "ads [that] suggest that brain 'repatterning' will foster effortless learning, creativity, and prosperity." He associated neuromythologies of left/right brain pseudoscience with specific New Age products and techniques. He stated that "the purveyors of neurobabble urge us to equate truth with what feels right and to abandon the commonsense insistence that those who would enlighten us provide at least as much evidence as we demand of politicians or used-car salesmen."

Examples
Psychobabble terms are typically words or phrases which have their roots in psychotherapeutic practice. Psychobabblers commonly overuse such terms as if they possessed some special value or meaning. 

Rosen has suggested that the following terms often appear in psychobabble:
co-dependent,
delusion,
denial,
dysfunctional,
empowerment,
holistic,
meaningful relationship,
multiple personality disorder,
narcissism,
psychosis,
self-actualization, 
synergy, and
mindfulness.
Extensive examples of psychobabble appear in Cyra McFadden's satirical novel The Serial: A Year in the Life of Marin County. In his collection of critical essays, Working with Structuralism (1981), the British scholar and novelist David Lodge gives a structural analysis of the language used in the novel and notes that McFadden endorsed the use of the term.

In 2010, Theodore Dalrymple defined psychobabble as "the means by which people talk about themselves without revealing anything."

See also

 Corporatese
 Glittering generality
 Gobbledygook
 Legalese
 Technobabble

References

Jargon
Popular psychology
Rhetoric
Types of scientific fallacy